John William Elder (8 July 1932 – 13 January 2018) was an Australian rules footballer who played for the Collingwood Football Club and South Melbourne Football Club in the Victorian Football League (VFL).

Notes

External links 		

		
1932 births
2018 deaths
Australian rules footballers from Victoria (Australia)
Collingwood Football Club players
Sydney Swans players